Samuel Hall Young (September 12, 1847–1927), more commonly known as S. Hall Young, was an American clergyman.

Early life and education
Born in Butler, Pennsylvania, Young's father was Reverend Loyal Young,D.D., and his mother was Margaret Porter Young. He had 6 brothers and one sister. Young graduated from the University of Wooster in Ohio and the Western Theological Seminary in Allegheny, Pennsylvania. He was ordained by the Presbyterian Church.

Career 
He went to Fort Wrangel, Alaska as a missionary and explorer, organized the first Protestant Church in Alaska, held pastorates in California, Illinois, Iowa, and Ohio and was later sent to the Klondike. In 1879 and again in 1880 he accompanied John Muir when he discovered Glacier Bay, Alaska. During a mountain climb on Mount Glenora( near Glenora, British Columbia) near the Stikine River, he almost fell to his death after dislocating both arms and was only saved from a narrow ledge when John Muir pulled him to safety with his teeth. This story is detailed by John Muir and Young in multiple subsequent publications. In 1904, he established the First Presbyterian Church in the new town of Fairbanks.  He was appointed superintendent of Presbyterian missions in Alaska. He was the Special Representative of the Presbyterian National Board of Missions. While exploring Alaska with John Muir, Young undertook a census of the native people living there.

Author 
In 1915 Young published Alaska Days with John Muir.

Adventurer 
Young was known to some as the "Mushing Parson." His dog was the hero of John Muir's classic children's book Stickeen: The Story of a Dog (1909), which relates the true adventures of Young, Muir and Young's dog Stickeen.

Personal life 
Young was married to Frances Eddy Young and had three children with her.

Death 
Young died at the age of 79 in Clarksburg, West Virginia and is buried in Syracuse, New York.

References

External links
 
 
 

1847 births
1927 deaths
People from Butler, Pennsylvania
College of Wooster alumni
Pittsburgh Theological Seminary alumni
American Presbyterian ministers
People from Fairbanks, Alaska
Christians from Alaska
Religious leaders from Alaska
People of pre-statehood Alaska
People of the Klondike Gold Rush
Presbyterianism in Alaska